Ebbin is a surname. Notable people with the surname include:

Adam Ebbin (born 1963), American politician
Luke Ebbin, American record producer, composer, and songwriter